Xishan may refer to the following locations in China:

Western Hills (西山), mountain range in the west of Beijing
Western Mountains (西山), mountain range located 12 km west of Kunming in Yunnan
Xishan (Xīshān, lit. "Tin Hill"), a hill in Wuxi's Xihui Park
Xishan District, Wuxi (锡山区), Jiangsu
Xishan District, Kunming (西山区), Yunnan
Xishan, Guiping (西山镇), town in Guangxi

See also 
 西山 (disambiguation), including Japanese uses
 Nishiyama (disambiguation), most common Japanese reading